Samuel Travis Sicilia (born February 1, 1986) is an American professional mixed martial artist who currently competes in the featherweight division for Bellator MMA. A professional competitor since 2007, Sicilia formerly competed for the UFC, and was on FX's The Ultimate Fighter: Live.

Background
Born and raised in Spokane, Washington, Sicilia competed in wrestling at Mt. Spokane High School and now works as an assistant coach for the team.

Mixed martial arts career

Early career
Sicilia began training in MMA in 2007, taking his first amateur fights late in the year and amassed a 4–1 record before turning professional shortly after. Following his first professional win he took a nearly four-year break from fighting. He then returned in 2011, and went 9–1 fighting for several regional promotions in the Northwestern United States.

The Ultimate Fighter
In February 2012, it was revealed that Sicilia was selected to be a participant on The Ultimate Fighter: Live. Sicilia defeated Dominick Cruz training partner, Erin Beach, via an eight-second KO to move into the Ultimate Fighter house, and become an official cast member.

Sicilia was selected as the second pick (third overall) by Dominick Cruz to take part on Team Cruz. In the first round of the tournament, Sicilia was selected to fight former Bellator Fighting Championships fighter, Chris Saunders. Sicilia lost the fight via split decision after two rounds. The decision was heavily disputed by many, including UFC president Dana White who claimed, "I think Sicilia got robbed of the opportunity of going to a third round, though. But great fight."

Ultimate Fighting Championship
Sicilia made his UFC debut at The Ultimate Fighter 15 Finale on June 1, 2012, in Las Vegas, Nevada, against TUF castmate, Cristiano Marcello. He won the fight via KO in the second round. After the win Sicilia expressed interest in returning to the featherweight division.

Sicilia dropped to the featherweight division and faced Rony Jason on October 13, 2012, at UFC 153.  Sicilia lost via second-round TKO due to punches.

Sicilia next face Maximo Blanco on April 13, 2013, at The Ultimate Fighter 17 Finale. He lost the fight via unanimous decision.

Sicilia was expected to face Godofredo Pepey on September 4, 2013, at UFC Fight Night 28.  However, Pepey pulled out of the bout citing an injury and was replaced by Felipe Arantes.  Subsequently, Sicilia also pulled out of the bout for undisclosed reasons and was replaced by Kevin Souza.

The bout with Pepey eventually took place on November 9, 2013, at UFC Fight Night 32. Sicilia won the fight via TKO in the first round.

Sicilia faced Cole Miller on January 15, 2014, at UFC Fight Night 35. He lost the fight via submission in the second round.

Sicilia was expected to face promotional newcomer Doo Ho Choi on May 24, 2014, at UFC 173. However, Choi pulled out of the bout citing an injury. Sicilia instead faced promotional newcomer Aaron Phillips. He won the fight via unanimous decision.

Sicilia faced Katsunori Kikuno at UFC Fight Night 52 on September 20, 2014.  He lost the fight via submission in the second round.

Sicilia next fought Akira Corassani on January 24, 2015, at UFC on Fox 14. Sicilia won the fight via KO in the first round.

A rescheduled bout with Doo Ho Choi was expected to take place on July 15, 2015, at UFC Fight Night 71. However, Choi pulled out of the fight in late June for undisclosed reasons and was replaced by Yaotzin Meza. Sicilia won the fight by unanimous decision.

A bout with Choi was scheduled a third time and took place on November 21, 2015, at UFC Fight Night 79. Sicilia lost the bout via TKO in the first round.

Sicilia next faced Gabriel Benítez on September 17, 2016, at UFC Fight Night 94. He lost the fight via submission in the second round.

Sicilia faced promotional newcomer Gavin Tucker on February 19, 2017, at UFC Fight Night 105. He lost the fight via unanimous decision.

In May 2017, Sicilia was released from the company.

Bellator MMA
On August 17, 2017, it was announced that Sicilia signed with Bellator MMA.

Sicilia faced former Bellator champion Marcos Galvão at Bellator 189 on December 1, 2017. He won the fight by unanimous decision.

In his second fight for the promotion, Sicilia faced Emmanuel Sanchez at Bellator 198 on April 28, 2018. He lost the fight via arm-triangle choke submission in the first round.

In his third fight for the promotion, Sicilia faced Derek Campos at Bellator 212 on December 14, 2018. He won the back-and-forth fight by split decision.

In April 2019, news surfaced that Sicilia had signed a new exclusive, multi-fight contract with Bellator.

Bellator Featherweight grand prix
In the initial round of Bellator's Featherweight GP, Sicilia lost to Pedro Carvalho at Bellator 226 due to a Face crank on September 7, 2019.

Post-GP
Sicilia faced Robert Whiteford at Bellator London 2 on November 23, 2019. Despite dropping Whiteford multiple times during the bout, Whiteford came back and knocked Sicilia out with only six seconds left in the final round.

Film and television
Sicilia was featured in the award-winning mixed martial arts documentary Fight Life, the film is directed by James Z. Feng and released in 2013.

Sam and his wife Lyndsie have a daughter, Sienna Noel who was born on July 4, 2018.

Mixed martial arts record

|-
|Loss
|align=center|17–11
|Robert Whiteford
|KO (punches)
|Bellator London 2
|
|align=center|3
|align=center|4:54
|London, England
|
|-
|Loss
|align=center|17–10
|Pedro Carvalho
|Submission (face crank)
|Bellator 226
|
|align=center|2
|align=center|1:56
|San Jose, California, United States 
|
|-
|Win
|align=center|17–9
|Derek Campos
|Decision (split)
|Bellator 212
|
|align=center|3
|align=center|5:00
|Honolulu, Hawaii, United States
|
|-
|Loss
|align=center|16–9
|Emmanuel Sanchez
|Submission (arm-triangle choke)
|Bellator 198
|
|align=center|1
|align=center|3:52
|Rosemont, Illinois, United States
|
|-
|Win
|align=center|16–8
|Marcos Galvão
|Decision (unanimous)
|Bellator 189
|
|align=center|3
|align=center|5:00
|Thackerville, Oklahoma, United States
|
|-
|Loss
|align=center|15–8
|Gavin Tucker
|Decision (unanimous)
|UFC Fight Night: Lewis vs. Browne
|
|align=center|3
|align=center|5:00
|Halifax, Nova Scotia, Canada
|
|-
|Loss
|align=center|15–7
|Gabriel Benítez
|Technical Submission (guillotine choke)
|UFC Fight Night: Poirier vs. Johnson
|
|align=center|2
|align=center|1:20
|Hidalgo, Texas, United States
|
|-
|Loss
|align=center|15–6
|Choi Doo-ho
|KO (punches)
|UFC Fight Night: Henderson vs. Masvidal
|
|align=center|1
|align=center|1:33
|Seoul, South Korea
|
|-
|Win
|align=center|15–5
|Yaotzin Meza
|Decision (unanimous)
|UFC Fight Night: Mir vs. Duffee
|
|align=center|3 
|align=center|5:00
|San Diego, California, United States
|
|-
|Win
|align=center|14–5
|Akira Corassani
|KO (punch) 
|UFC on Fox: Gustafsson vs. Johnson
|
|align=center|1
|align=center|3:26
|Stockholm, Sweden
|
|-
|Loss
|align=center|13–5
|Katsunori Kikuno
|Submission (rear-naked choke)
|UFC Fight Night: Hunt vs. Nelson
|
|align=center|2
|align=center|1:38
|Saitama, Japan
|
|-
|Win
|align=center|13–4
|Aaron Phillips
|Decision (unanimous)
|UFC 173
|
|align=center|3
|align=center|5:00
|Las Vegas, Nevada, United States
|
|-
|Loss
|align=center|12–4
|Cole Miller
|Submission (rear-naked choke)
|UFC Fight Night: Rockhold vs. Philippou
|
|align=center|2
|align=center|1:54
|Duluth, Georgia, United States
|
|-
|Win
|align=center|12–3
|Godofredo Pepey
|TKO (punches)
|UFC Fight Night: Belfort vs. Henderson
|
|align=center|1
|align=center|1:42
|Goiânia, Brazil
|
|-
|Loss
|align=center|11–3
|Maximo Blanco
|Decision (unanimous)
|The Ultimate Fighter: Team Jones vs. Team Sonnen Finale
|
|align=center|3
|align=center|5:00
|Las Vegas, Nevada, United States
|
|-
|Loss
|align=center|11–2
|Rony Jason
|TKO (punches)
|UFC 153
|
|align=center|2
|align=center|4:16
|Rio de Janeiro, Brazil
|
|-
|Win
|align=center|11–1
|Cristiano Marcello
|KO (knees and punches)
|The Ultimate Fighter: Live Finale
|
|align=center|2
|align=center|2:53
|Las Vegas, Nevada, United States
|
|-
|Win
|align=center|10–1
|Arley George
|KO (punch)
|Conquest of the Cage 10
|
|align=center|1
|align=center|0:25
|Airway Heights, Washington, United States
|
|-
|Win
|align=center|9–1
|Jared Haller
|TKO (punches)
|Caged Conflict
|
|align=center|1
|align=center|0:25
|Canyonville, Oregon, United States
|
|-
|Win
|align=center|8–1
|Josiah Mitchell
|KO (punch)
|CageSport 16
|
|align=center|1
|align=center|0:29
|Tacoma, Washington, United States
|
|-
|Win
|align=center|7–1
|Dominic Rivera
|Submission (rear-naked choke)
|Fight Night Round 16
|
|align=center|1
|align=center|2:38
|Anacortes, Washington, United States
|
|-
|Win
|align=center|6–1
|Josh Snodgrass
|Submission (rear-naked choke)
|Caged Combat 4
|
|align=center|1
|align=center|1:48
|Grand Ronde, Oregon, United States
|
|-
|Win
|align=center|5–1
|Angel Diaz
|KO (punch)
|Lords of the Cage 7
|
|align=center|1
|align=center|3:35
|Manson, Washington, United States
|
|-
|Loss
|align=center|4–1
|Daniel Swain
|Submission (rear-naked choke)
|Lords of the Cage 6
|
|align=center|1
|align=center|2:37
|Yakima, Washington, United States
|
|-
|Win
|align=center|4–0
|Charon Spain
|Submission (neck crank)
|Lords of the Cage 5
|
|align=center|1
|align=center|4:03
|Airway Heights, Washington, United States
|
|-
|Win
|align=center|3–0
|Marc Forsyth
|Submission (rear-naked choke)
|Rumble on the Ridge 17
|
|align=center|2
|align=center|4:07
|Snoqualmie, Washington, United States
|
|-
|Win
|align=center|2–0
|Jason Gybels
|KO (punches)
|Rumble on the Ridge 16
|
|align=center|1
|align=center|2:54
|Snoqualmie, Washington, United States
|
|-
|Win
|align=center|1–0
|Brian Clayton
|Decision (unanimous)
|Combat Caged Warriors 4
|
|align=center|3
|align=center|5:00
|Tri-Cities, Washington, United States
|
|}

Mixed martial arts exhibition record

|-
| Loss
| align=center|1–1
| Chris Saunders
| Decision (split)
| The Ultimate Fighter: Live
| 
| align=center| 2
| align=center| 5:00
| Las Vegas, Nevada, United States
|
|-
|Win
| align=center|1–0
| Erin Beach
| KO (punch)
| The Ultimate Fighter: Live
| 
| align=center| 1
| align=center| 0:08
| Las Vegas, Nevada, United States
|
|-

See also
 List of current Bellator fighters
 List of male mixed martial artists

References

External links
 
 

1986 births
Living people
American people of Italian descent
Sportspeople from Spokane, Washington
Mixed martial artists from Washington (state)
American male mixed martial artists
Mixed martial artists utilizing wrestling
Ultimate Fighting Championship male fighters
American male sport wrestlers
Amateur wrestlers